Intimacy: Album III is the third studio album from R&B artist Kem.

It was released on August 17, 2010 on Motown Records. This is his first album in five years releasing two albums on Motown and his only release on Universal Motown records following the dissolution of the label. The first single, "Why Would You Stay", received a great deal of airplay, peaking at number 17 and 14 on Billboards Hot R&B/Hip Hop Songs and Heatseekers charts respectively. Like other albums, it is self-produced by Kem and features a duet with Maurissa Rose and spoken word by Jill Scott. The album debuted at number 95 on the Hot R&B/Hip-hop albums chart and rose to number 2 the following week. A remix of "If It's Love" was also released, this time featuring R&B artist Chrisette Michele.

The album debuted at number two on the US Billboard 200 chart, selling 74,000 copies in its first week in the United States, becoming Kem's highest-charting set ever. In March 2012, the album was certified Gold by the RIAA.

Track listing

Charts

Weekly charts

Year-end charts

References 

Kem (singer) albums
2010 albums
Universal Records albums